Ethanimine is an organonitrogen compound classified as an imine. It is formed by reacting acetaldehyde and ammonia, but rapidly polymerizes to acetaldehyde ammonia trimer.

It has two tautomers: ethanimine, an imine, and ethenamine or aminoethylene, an amine. Ethanimine has two hydrogens on the carbon, while ethenamine has two on the nitrogen atom.

Occurrence
It is not well known terrestrially, but has been detected in abundance toward Sagittarius B2 (Sgr B2), a dense interstellar cloud between stars toward the galactic center of the Milky Way. The distance between the Sgr B2 cloud and center of galaxy is 100 pc (1 pc = 3.26 ly). Ethanimine is mainly found in hot cores of ISM clouds; in case of Sgr B2, the region would be the Sgr B2 N and Sgr B2 M. Radio telescopes such as the Green Bank Observatory's Green Bank Telescope and those operated by the National Radio Astronomy Observatory (measuring radio frequency light lambda ranging from 1–300 GHz) are able to detect organic molecules such as ethanimines because its internal energy transition, more specifically the rotational transition is within the radio frequency of 14085 MHz = 140.8 GHz.

References

Imines
Amines